Events during the year 2019 in Ireland.

Incumbents

 President: Michael D. Higgins 
 Taoiseach: Leo Varadkar (FG)
 Tánaiste: Simon Coveney (FG)
 Minister for Finance: Paschal Donohoe (FG)
 Chief Justice: Frank Clarke 
 Dáil: 32nd
 Seanad: 25th

Events

January 

 1 January 
 Abortion services became available in Ireland for the first time under the provisions of the Health (Regulation of Termination of Pregnancy) Act 2018.
 Two fast-food workers were shot by a raider at Edenmore Shopping Centre in Coolock.
Library fines were abolished to encourage library usage.
 2 January – New domestic violence legislation was enacted which included new crimes of coercive control.
 3 January 
 The Luas website went offline after a message was posted to it threatening to "publish all data and send emails to your users" unless "1 bitcoin" was paid in five days.
 Contingency plans for a no-deal Brexit were discussed at the first Cabinet meeting of 2019.
 4 January – Former Senator James Heffernan was found guilty of assaulting three gardaí after he was arrested outside the Indiependence Music Festival in August 2016.
 5 January – Figures from Eurostat showed that the Irish police-to-population ratio was less than the European average with 278 Garda officers per 100,000 of the population.
 6 January – Garda sources confirmed that a man named as having been captured in Syria by militias fighting against ISIS was a naturalised Irish citizen.
 7 January – A Garda investigation began after skeletal remains were found by a passerby in a ditch in the townland of Ballyandrew, County Wexford.
 9 January – The Government offered protection to five unaccompanied child migrants who had been seeking refuge in Malta after being rescued from the Mediterranean.
 10 January – A fire broke out at the Shannon Key West Hotel in Roosky which had been due to open as an accommodation centre for asylum seekers.
 11 January – 17-year-old Adam Kelly from Skerries Community College was named the 55th BT Young Scientist & Technologist of the Year.
 12 January – One of the most senior figures in the Kinahan organised crime gang was arrested at Birmingham Airport in a joint operation between the Gardaí and the NCA.
 13 January – Fianna Fáil announced plans to reintroduce a Bill to the Seanad which aims to protect and give official recognition to the National Anthem.
 15 January – Galway-based Supermac's won its long-running case against fast food giant McDonald's to have the use of the Big Mac trademark cancelled.
 16 January – The Finance Minister ordered a new economic assessment for the country after a parliamentary defeat for the British Government's Brexit withdrawal agreement.
 17 January 
Aer Lingus unveiled its new brand livery which included a new shamrock logo, a new font, and teal as the main colour on the undercarriage, tail and engines of its planes.
The Dáil was told that a woman carrying a baby diagnosed with a fatal foetal abnormality was not granted a termination at the Coombe Hospital in Dublin.
A 22-year-old man died after being shot in the head and chest in a car park outside a gym in Swords in Dublin.
 18 January – A man is shot dead and a woman injured at a house in Warrenpoint, County Down.
 19 January – 
Hundreds of young people attended a protest at Leinster House calling on the Government to do more to tackle climate change.
A car bomb exploded outside a courthouse in Derry. The New IRA are believed to be responsible.
 20 January – A commemoration was held to mark the 100th anniversary of the Soloheadbeg Ambush, which is considered to have started the War of Independence.
 21 January – The centenary of the First Dáil was commemorated with a joint sitting of the Dáil and Seanad in the round room of the Mansion House in Dublin.
 22 January – European Commission spokesman Margaritis Schinas said Ireland would see a new "hard border" if the UK failed to approve a Brexit withdrawal deal.
 23 January – Gardaí seized almost €1 million worth of cannabis in Drogheda.
 24 January – The Government published legislation that would underpin Ireland's plan to deal with a no-deal Brexit.
 25 January – The Taoiseach warned of the prospect of "a police presence, or an army presence" at the border in a worst-case Brexit.
 26 January – Up to 1,500 people attended a protest on the old Dublin road near Carrickcaron, County Louth to demonstrate against a hard Brexit.
 27 January – Four men in their early twenties were killed in a road accident near Gort an Choirce, County Donegal.
 28 January – Former Sinn Féin TD Peadar Tóibín launched a new political party called Aontú.
 29 January – The Cabinet agreed to hold a referendum which, if passed, would delete a Constitutional clause requiring a mandatory period of separation before divorce.
 30 January – Hospital and community care services were severely disrupted by the first 24-hour nurses' strike in 20 years.

February
 1 February – Skeletal remains and a ring fort, believed to date back to the Bronze Age, were discovered on land where former Taoiseach Liam Cosgrave lived in Dublin.
 2 February – The chairman of the National Children's Hospital Development board Tom Costello resigned following the controversy over the spiralling costs of the project.
 3 February – Damian Foxall made a 400-metre descent on skis from the summit of Ireland's highest mountain, Carrauntoohil.
 4 February – The Central Bank announced that €674m was paid by banks in redress, compensation and costs to customers caught up in the tracker mortgage controversy.
 5 February – Nearly 40,000 nurses and midwives undertook a second day of strike action in an ongoing dispute over pay and retention issues.
 6 February – European Commission President Jean-Claude Juncker said Ireland will not be left alone and the EU is ready to assist Ireland in the event of a no-deal Brexit.
 7 February – More than 35,000 nurses took to the picket line for the third time in nine days causing widespread chaos in hospitals and in the community.
 8 February
A 39-year-old man died after being shot a number of times after leaving his home for work in Darndale.
The Taoiseach met each of the five main Stormont parties in Belfast before hosting discussions with British Prime Minister Theresa May at Farmleigh.
 9 February
Tens of thousands of people took part in a rally in support of nurses and midwives who are involved in a dispute over pay and staffing levels.
The SDLP voted by more than two to one to back a new partnership with Fianna Fáil.
 10 February 
The Health Minister Simon Harris and his family were trapped in their home in Greystones where up to 20 people arrived outside, claiming to be "against austerity".
It was later announced that Harris will apologise to the Dáil over information he provided on the cost of the new National Children's Hospital.
 11 February 
President Higgins began a three-day visit to England, during which he is expected to call for ties between Ireland and the UK to remain strong after Brexit.
After discussions at the Labour Court, the INMO and the Psychiatric Nurses Association suspended their proposed three days of industrial action.
 12 February – Health Minister Simon Harris apologised to the Dáil for not answering questions on the cost of the National Children's Hospital "more fully" last September.
 13 February 
Former Taoiseach Bertie Ahern gave evidence to the Committee for Exiting the European Union in Westminster.
The Irish Nurses and Midwives Organisation recommended acceptance of the Labour Court recommendations aimed at resolving their dispute over pay and conditions.
 14 February – A woman in her early 70s died following a collision with a Luas tram in Tallaght.
 15 February – The fifth plenary session of the All-Island Civic Dialogue on Brexit took place at Dublin Castle.
 16 February – A controlled explosion was carried out on a hand grenade believed to date from the War of Independence in Lahinch, County Clare.
 17 February – Ten members of the 'Fingal Battalion' group protested outside the home of Communications Minister Richard Bruton.
 18 February – An investigation got under way after a medical centre on the outskirts of Longford town was daubed with anti-abortion graffiti overnight.
 19 February – An Irish ticket holder won the EuroMillions jackpot worth €175,475,380.
 20 February – A Sinn Féin-tabled no confidence motion in Health Minister Simon Harris was defeated in a Dáil vote by 58 votes to 53 with 40 abstentions.
 21 February – All operations at Dublin Airport were suspended for 30 minutes after a pilot spotted a drone over the airfield.
 22 February – Tánaiste Simon Coveney launched emergency measures to protect Ireland in the event of a "lose, lose, lose" no-deal Brexit.
 23 February – At the 79th Fianna Fáil Ardfheis, party leader Micheál Martin said that the national interest demanded a general election be avoided because of Brexit.
 24 February – The Taoisaech attended the inaugural EU-Arab League summit in Sharm El Sheikh.
 25 February – A search began for the missing head of an 800-year-old Crusader after vandals broke into St. Michan's Church and decapitated his mummified remains.
 26 February – The Government announced that was to make up to €428 million available to prepare the country for Brexit this year.
 27 February – Newly released figures revealed that a record number of 9,987 people were homeless in January, including 3,624 children.
 28 February 
A 30-year-old Italian man was jailed for three-and-a-half years for the assault of Liverpool fan Seán Cox outside Anfield last April.
A security alert was sparked at the Leinster House complex when Fine Gael TD Noel Rock was followed inside and confronted by a protester.

March

 1 March – Businessman Denis O'Brien lost his High Court action alleging he was defamed in articles published in the Sunday Business Post.
 2 March – A protest took place outside Dublin's GPO following a rise in the number of assaults and cases of racial abuse on foreign nationals.
 3 March – Ulster Council delegate Jarlath Burns said the GAA should not remain neutral if there is to be a referendum on Irish unity after Brexit.
 4 March – The Department of Health was evacuated after a package containing white powder, later revealed to be baking soda, was sent to Health Minister Simon Harris.
 5 March – Gardaí began helping an investigation by London Metropolitan Police after three explosive devices, posted in Dublin, were sent to key transport hubs in London.
 6 March – Transport Minister Shane Ross apologised after referring to Sinn Féin's transport spokeswoman Imelda Munster as a "donkey".
 7 March – Aer Lingus confirmed that its female cabin crew will no longer be required to wear make-up or skirts as part of new uniform rules.
 8 March – A former female member of the Irish Defence Forces was detained in Syria over alleged membership of ISIS.
 9 March – Controlled drugs with an estimated street value of €865,000 were seized by Gardaí in County Meath.
 10 March – 39-year-old Micheál Ryan was among the 157 people who were on board an Ethiopian Airlines flight which crashed while en route from Addis Ababa to Nairobi.
 11 March – MMA fighter Conor McGregor was arrested and charged with robbery and criminal damage in Miami after allegedly smashing a fan's phone.
 12 March – The Irish Aviation Authority suspended the operation of all Boeing 737 MAX aircraft into and out of Irish airspace after two recent accidents involving the aircraft elsewhere in the world.
 13 March – New research revealed that Dublin entered the top five most expensive locations in Europe for rental accommodation for the first time.
 14 March
Northern Ireland's Public Prosecution Service decided that one former British Army soldier is to be charged with the murder of civilians on Bloody Sunday in January 1972.
The Taoiseach met with the US President Donald Trump at the White House where Mr Trump said he was planning to visit Ireland in the year.
 15 March – Thousands of students took part in school strikes and demonstrations around the country in protest at what they said was Government inaction on climate change.
 16 March – At least eight people were taken to hospital following a collision between a Luas tram and a double-decker bus at Queen Street in Smithfield, Dublin.
 17 March
Hundreds of thousands of people attended more than 100 parades and festivities in cities, towns and villages across the country to mark St. Patrick's Day.
Three teenagers are crushed to death at a St Patrick's Day disco party in a hotel in Cookstown, County Tyrone.
 18 March – The FAI reiterated that the €100,000 bridging loan they received from chief executive John Delaney "was made in the best interests" of the association.
 19 March 
The Taoiseach met with EU Council President Donald Tusk in Dublin ahead of Thursday's EU Council summit regarding the Brexit negotiations.
It was announced that Joe Murphy, a hunger striker who died in 1920, was to receive a posthumous service medal in recognition of his role in the fight for independence.
 20 March – The Cabinet approved a number of issues regarding the introduction of directly elected mayors in Cork, Limerick and Waterford.
 21 March – The Department of Justice confirmed that a plan to provide an accommodation centre for asylum seekers at a disused hotel in Rooskey will not now go ahead.
 22 March – The Army's Bomb Squad made safe the viable improvised explosive device recovered from a Limerick An Post office.
 23 March – Eric Eoin Marques was extradited to the United States over allegations that he conspired to distribute and advertise child abuse images on the dark web.
 25 March – A young mother died after a freak accident at Cork University Maternity Hospital. Her newborn baby died from injuries almost 36 hours later.
 26 March – Average noise levels at Dublin Airport are to be kept below 45 decibels after TDs voted in favour of the restrictions.
 27 March – The Department of Housing, Planning and Local Government announced that the number of homeless people in emergency accommodation exceeded 10,000 for the first time.
 28 March – The Eurosceptic Irish Freedom Party launched a nationwide billboard campaign calling for the country to leave the European Union.
 29 March – A father who slapped his two-year-old daughter in a Cork supermarket, causing concerned witnesses to report him to Gardaí, was convicted and fined €700.
 30 March – Border Communities Against Brexit organised a number of mass demonstrations on the border to mark the day after Brexit had been due to take place.
 31 March – Minister of State Finian McGrath was criticised for suggesting Gardaí were involved in political policing and had an agenda implementing drink-driving laws.

April
 1 April – Tánaiste and Minister for Foreign Affairs Simon Coveney said a no-deal Brexit had shifted from a "remote possibility" to a "real possibility".
 2 April 
 Facebook Chief Executive Mark Zuckerberg visited the company's international headquarters in Dublin and discussed a range of "policy issues" with a number of TDs.
  Taoiseach Leo Varadkar met French President Emmanuel Macron for Brexit talks in Paris.
 3 April – It was announced that turbans and the hijab would be allowed to be worn by Sikh and Muslim members of the Garda Síochána.
 4 April – German Chancellor Angela Merkel met with the Taoiseach in Dublin to discuss Brexit, and show solidarity with Ireland amid the Brexit negotiations.
 5 April – An inquest found that a botched IRA warning call contributed to the deaths of 21 people unlawfully killed in the 1974 Birmingham pub bombings.
 6 April – Irish-trained Tiger Roll won the 2019 Grand National, therefore becoming the tenth horse to win the race more than once.
 7 April – An earthquake with a magnitude of 2.4 in Killybegs, County Donegal was detected by the Irish National Seismic Network.
 8 April 
Sinn Féin leader Mary Lou McDonald accused UK Secretary of State for Northern Ireland Karen Bradley of not having a "deep appreciation" of Irish politics.
The European Union's chief Brexit negotiator Michel Barnier said the EU will "stand fully behind Ireland" regardless of what happens in the Brexit negotiations.
 9 April – Sport Ireland decided to suspend and withhold future funding to the FAI after it emerged the association was to reveal it failed to obey State funding rules.
 10 April – FAI executive vice-president John Delaney was accused of behaving "disgracefully" by not answering TDs' questions at an Oireachtas committee meeting.
 11 April – Former INLA member Dessie O'Hare was jailed for seven years for his involvement in a gang which evicted a man and his family from their home.
 12 April – Ireland's Ambassador to the UK accused the British political magazine The Spectator of making a "hostile" anti-Irish attack which should be consigned to the past.
 13 April – President Higgins addressed an event to mark the 175th anniversary of the Society of St Vincent de Paul in Ireland.
 15 April 
The PSNI announced that a British soldier who shot and killed 15-year-old Daniel Hegarty in Derry in July 1972 is to be charged with murder.
John Delaney stepped aside from his role as Executive Vice-President of the FAI pending the completion of an independent review.
 16 April 
The Speaker of the US House of Representatives Nancy Pelosi and a team of high-ranking US politicians began a two-day visit to Dublin.
The Minister for Transport, Tourism and Sport, Shane Ross, said that the FAI had written to him indicating that the organisation's board will step down.
 17 April 
The Speaker of the US House of Representatives Nancy Pelosi hailed the Good Friday Agreement as a "beacon to the world" during her address to Dáil Éireann.
Katherine Zappone was criticised for suggesting the people of Tuam knew more about what happened to babies in the mother and baby home than they were sharing.
 18 April – The 70th anniversary of Ireland becoming a Republic was commemorated.
 19 April – Politicians and leaders, including the President and Taoiseach, united in their condemnation of the murder of journalist Lyra McKee in Derry.
 20 April – Saoradh, a far left political party with links to the so-called New IRA, were criticised for holding a march on O'Connell Street.
 21 April – President Higgins led a military commemoration of the Easter Rising at the GPO on O'Connell Street.
 22 April
 Two marches were held in Dublin by the 32 County Sovereignty Movement and Republican Sinn Féin.
 The Irish Prison Service announced that almost €700,000 was to be spent over the next two years on the electronic tagging of prisoners.
 23 April – New legislation was published which will allow up to 60,000 parents a year to gain new paid parental leave and benefit from November.
 24 April
Consultants claimed that conditions are so bad at University Hospital Waterford that dead bodies have been left on trolleys, often leaking body fluids on to the floor.
The President, the Taoiseach and the British Prime Minister Theresa May attended the funeral of Lyra McKee in Derry.
 25 April – Three teenagers required medical attention for burns after they were splashed with a corrosive liquid during an altercation in Waterford.
 26 April
A Status Red wind warning for County Clare was issued by Met Éireann in preparation for Storm Hannah.
The Taoiseach and the UK Prime Minister confirmed the establishment of talks involving the main political parties in Northern Ireland in an effort to restore power-sharing.
 27 April – Minister for Health Simon Harris announced that he wants to make children's vaccinations mandatory and has sought legal advice on the matter.
 28 April – Members the Fingal Battalion Direct Action Group protested outside the home of Minister for Health Simon Harris for a number of hours in Greystones.
 29 April – An earthquake with a magnitude of 2.1 was recorded about 15 km south east of Donegal and 15 km north east of Ballyshannon.
 30 April – A memorial to the 49,000 Irishmen who died in Flanders was inaugurated in the Peace Garden in Dublin.

May
 1 May – After a 15-week trial and 20 hours of deliberations, the jury found 50-year-old farmer Patrick Quirke guilty of murdering his so-called love rival Bobby Ryan.
 2 May – Three people were rescued after a fire on board a fishing vessel 29 miles east of Arklow.
 3 May – Terminally ill Ruth Morrissey was awarded €2.1 million in damages over the misreading of smear tests and the failure to tell her about it.
 4 May – The Taoiseach apologised unreservedly to anyone who feels he did not treat seriously the concerns raised about mortuary services at University Hospital Waterford.
 7 May – The Cabinet approved the €3 billion National Broadband Plan (NBP) which aims to bring high-speed internet to more than 540,000 premises across rural Ireland.
 8 May 
Former Sinn Féin leader Gerry Adams repeated his denial that he was a member of the IRA, but said he will never disassociate himself from the organisation.
A memo from the Department of Public Expenditure revealed that it recommended the government not proceed with the preferred bidder for the National Broadband Plan .
 9 May – Garda Commissioner Drew Harris said the system to ensure disqualified drivers do not use the roads is "not working" and has created issues around road safety.
 10 May – Ireland became only the second country in the world to declare a climate and biodiversity emergency.
 11 May
A 58-year-old man died after falling on Carrauntoohil in County Kerry.
Three American students were rescued from the base of a 60-metre cliff near Slea Head after becoming trapped by the incoming tide.
 13 May – Prosecutors in Florida dropped all charges against mixed martial artist Conor McGregor after he was accused of stamping on a fan's mobile phone.
 14 May – Leading National Hunt owner Michael O'Leary announced that he was to phase out his racing team at Gigginstown House Stud over the next "four or five years".
 15 May – United States sources revealed that President Donald Trump would visit Ireland "within weeks".
 16 May – Three members of the Garda Síochána – a superintendent, an inspector and a detective – were arrested for alleged links with a Munster organised crime group.
 17 May – Murdered journalist Lyra McKee was posthumously honoured with a special award for outstanding commitment and contribution to journalism.
 18 May – The main runway at Cork Airport was closed temporarily after a light aircraft experienced difficulties with its landing gear.
 19 May – The son of Sophie Toscan du Plantier appealed for witnesses to come forward and give evidence in the upcoming trial in France of Ian Bailey.
 20 May – Britain's Prince Charles and his wife, Camilla, Duchess of Cornwall, began a two-day visit to Ireland.
 21 May 
A Drinkaware survey revealed that more than one in five Irish adults are classified as a hazardous drinker.
The White House confirmed that President Donald Trump would visit Ireland on 5 June as part of a three-day visit to his Doonbeg resort.
 22 May – King Carl XVI Gustaf and Queen Silvia of Sweden began a three-day state visit to Ireland.
 23 May – Gardaí in Drogheda arrested 18 people and seized seven cars as part of an operation targeting feuding gangs in the town.
 24 May – Elections to the European Parliament, local authorities and a divorce referendum were held across Ireland.
 25 May – An off-duty Garda died in a freak diving accident several miles off Hook Head.
 26 May – The referendum on divorce was passed by a large majority with a final result of 82.1% voting in favour, and 17.9% voting against.
 27 May – The trial of Ian Bailey for the murder of French woman Sophie Toscan du Plantier in West Cork in 1996 started in Paris.
 28 May – More than 20,000 passengers were affected by delays to rail travel after services in and out of Heuston Station were suspended following a major signal fault.
 29 May – Fine Gael confirmed an internal review will be established to examine the facts surrounding Maria Bailey's civil case that was dropped earlier in the week.
 30 May – A full recount was announced in the Ireland South constituency, which the returning officer saying it may cost up to €1 million, and could take up to 28 working days.
 31 May – Ian Bailey was found guilty in absentia by a French court of the murder of Sophie Toscan du Plantier in 1996. Bailey's solicitors described proceedings as a "show trial."

June
 1 June – Prominent Donegal county councillor Frank McBrearty Jnr resigned from the Fine Gael party just days after winning them a seat on the local council.
 3 June – The Archbishop of Dublin Diarmuid Martin said violence in the capital has taken on an "unprecedented level of depravity".
 4 June – Sinn Féin withdrew its request for a full recount in the European Parliament election for Ireland South after initial counting indicated no major ballot anomalies.
 5 June 
Around 124,000 students began their Leaving Certificate and Junior Cycle exams.
President Trump and First Lady Melania landed at Shannon Airport to begin their first official visit to Ireland.
 6 June – Around 2,000 people protested in Dublin city centre against the ongoing visit of Donald Trump to Ireland.
 7 June – 27-year-old Dubliner Fiona Geraghty was one of 17 people killed in a bus crash in Dubai.
 8 June – Eleven people appeared in court charged with over 200 counts relating to the alleged rape, sexual exploitation and neglect of children.
 9 June – The Scottish Government said Irish vessels could be boarded if they do not stop fishing in the waters around the disputed Rockall.
 10 June – Former US Secretary of State John Kerry at an ocean summit in Cork criticised world leaders who have been lying about the climate crisis and have dismissed the scientific evidence.
 11 June 
A 39-year-old man was fatally stabbed on O'Connell Street in Dublin.
The second report of the Scally Inquiry into the CervicalCheck scandal found wider outsourcing of screening tests, with 16 laboratories being used rather than six.
 There was major disruption on the 3.04pm rail service from Galway to Dublin Heuston when a woman went into labour and gave birth just outside Kildare.
 12 June – A court in Paris, which last week found Ian Bailey guilty of the murder of Sophie Toscan du Plantier, has ordered him to pay €115,000 to reimburse her family.
 13 June – Two men were killed after their light aircraft came down in a remote field near Athy, County Kildare.
 14 June – A man was arrested following the discovery of the body of a woman at a house near Westport, County Mayo.
 15 June – A formal apology was issued to former Garda Majella Moynihan, the woman who was found in breach of discipline after becoming pregnant out of wedlock in 1984.
 17 June – The Government launched its climate action plan in an effort to "nudge people and businesses to change behaviour" in a bid to tackle climate change.
 18 June – Two 14-year-old boys were found guilty of the murder of 14-year-old Ana Kriégel in Lucan in May 2018.
 19 June – Ireland was awarded a road safety prize from the European Transport Safety Council for its "exemplary progress" in reducing road deaths in recent years.
 20 June – Limerick was awarded the title of European Green Leaf 2020 for smaller cities.
 21 June – An Post announced that deliveries to the Mac Uilliam Estate in Tallaght have been suspended following ongoing threats to its staff.
 22 June – A grenade dating back to the Civil War was made safe by the Defence Forces army bomb disposal team after being found in Clontarf.
 23 June
Ireland's first Ironman Triathlon was held at Youghal, County Cork; however, poor weather conditions forced organisers to cancel the swim on safety grounds.
The Donegal International Rally was cancelled when Manus Kelly, who won the event for the last three years, was killed at Fanad Head.
 24 June – The Fine Gael organisation in Waterford passed a unanimous motion of no confidence in its sitting TD, John Deasy.
 25 June
 The Summer Economic Statement revealed that a no-deal Brexit would leave the Government having to borrow almost €5bn Instead of running a €1.2bn surplus.
 The statue of musician Luke Kelly on Dublin's Sheriff Street was vandalised with black paint.
 26 June – 10,000 HSE support staff at 38 hospitals took part in 24 hours of industrial action over pay.
 27 June – Siptu accepted an invitation to attend a preliminary hearing at the Labour Court to discuss the dispute involving 10,000 health service workers.
 28 June – The Taoiseach attended the 20th anniversary of the British-Irish Council in Manchester.
 29 June – Tens of thousands of people turned out on the streets of the capital to celebrate Dublin Pride.

July
 1 July 
Promising boxer Kevin Sheehy is killed in a hit-and-run incident in Limerick.
Edward Crawford presented his credentials to President Higgins to begin his tenure as United States Ambassador to Ireland officially.
 2 July – Barry's Tea withdrew its local sponsorship of an annual greyhound race following a Prime Time documentary on the sport in Ireland.
 3 July – The inquest into the death of Denis Donaldson was told that proceedings had been instituted against a person for his murder.
 4 July 
The chief executive of the NTMA said that Ireland has a "mountain of debt" that currently stands at €205 billion, some four times higher than it was in the 2000s.
Taoiseach Leo Varadkar apologised for his comments to Fianna Fáil leader Micheál Martin where he likened him to a "sinning priest".
 5 July – A two-year-old girl died in Cork University Hospital after being found seriously injured in an apartment in the city.
 8 July – The Irish Daily Mail was fined €25,000 for contempt of court arising from an article published during the trial of two teenage boys for the murder of Ana Kriégel.
 9 July 
The Taoiseach apologised on behalf of the State to people who were sexually abused in day schools before 1992.
A new air traffic surveillance system - which can accurately pinpoint the location of any aircraft in distress - was launched at the IAA's control centre near Shannon.
 10 July – Hundreds of farmers protested in Dublin to highlight their concerns about farm incomes and oppose the proposed Mercosur trade deal.
 11 July – A ten-year-old boy died following a drowning incident at a house in Carlingford, County Louth.
 12 July – Members of the Psychiatric Nurses Association deferred industrial action in a row over pay and working conditions.
 13 July – A potential data breach at Google was being assessed after reports that their Home smart speaker may have been recording conversations among users.
 14 July – Events were held around the country to mark the National Day of Commemoration.
 15 July – The world's first dedicated plastic waste to wax factory opened in County Laois.
 16 July – Gemma O'Doherty's YouTube account was permanently removed for breaching its policies on hate speech after posting a video which criticised ethnic minorities.
 17 July – The Minister for Health confirmed the creation of six new regional health boards in the biggest restructuring of the HSE since it was founded 15 years ago.
 18 July – ISIL bride Lisa Smith said she doesn't think she will ever be going back to Ireland and her decision to move to Islamic State (IS) "wasn't worth it".
 19 July – France's Europe Minister Amelie de Montchalin said she had seen at first hand the importance of an ordered Brexit after visiting the Irish border.
 20 July – Hundreds of protestors marched through the streets of Cork to protest the proposed closure of and the loss of 240 jobs at the Cork Mail Centre in Little Island.
 21 July – A man was taken to hospital after being struck by a car that drove at a number of persons in a crowded St. Patrick's Cemetery in Dundalk.
 22 July – An overtime ban involving 6,000 psychiatric nurses was to restart in 48 hours after talks between nurses and health-service management failed to reach an agreement.
 23 July – Fine Gael TD Maria Bailey was removed as Chairperson of the Joint Oireachtas Committee on Housing over the infamous swing case.
 24 July – Taoiseach Leo Varadkar said comments made by new British Prime Minister Boris Johnson about the Irish backstop are "not in the real world".
 25 July – The Gardaí began an investigation into the standard of care at Hyde & Seek creches after an RTÉ documentary revealed how children were roughly handled.
 26 July – The Tánaiste described Boris Johnson's approach to Brexit as "unhelpful" after a meeting with new Northern Ireland Secretary Julian Smith in Belfast.
 27 July – Sinn Féin leader Mary Lou McDonald said an all-Ireland forum on Irish unity should be convened without delay.
 29 July – 18-year-old Fionn Ferreira, from Ballydehob, was named the Grand Prize winner at the 2019 Google Science Fair.
 30 July – Taoiseach Leo Varadkar and British Prime Minister Boris Johnson spoke by telephone for the first time since Mr Johnson took office almost a week ago.
 31 July – The Central Bank warned that a no-deal Brexit would lead to a dramatic Irish economic slowdown and result in 34,000 fewer jobs.

August
 1 August – A man whose leg got trapped on the Connemara shoreline during a rising tide was brought to safety in a multi-agency rescue.
 2 August – It was confirmed that the Liffey Swim would go ahead as planned in spite of concerns over the result of water quality tests following a recent overflow into the river.
 3 August – Taoiseach Leo Varadkar took part in Belfast's pride parade for the first time.
 5 August – A 19-year-old man who was hospitalised over the weekend after taking a substance at the Indiependence music festival died.
 6 August 
The number of women identified as part of the CervicalCheck IT problem was revealed to be over 4,000, according to the Rapid Review report.
A 15-year-old boy from Navan died after falling from a wall on the Spanish island of Lanzarote.
 9 August – Former Taoiseach Enda Kenny won a yachting regatta alongside adventurer Bear Grylls in the Isle of Wight.
 10 August – Met Éireann issued a yellow weather warning for parts of the midlands and north-east as heavy rain was expected.
 11 August – The Sunday Telegraph in the UK claimed that British Prime Minister Boris Johnson had accepted an offer to meet the Taoiseach to discuss Brexit and the backstop.
 12 August – A spokesperson confirmed that, contrary to some reports, Boris Johnson had no meeting scheduled with the Taoiseach to discuss Brexit.
 13 August 
Almost 59,000 students received the results of their Leaving Certificate examinations, a 3% increase on numbers sitting the exam compared to last year.
A three-year-old Irish boy, who was in a critical condition following an incident at a swimming pool in Spain, died.
A body found in a rain forest in Malaysia was confirmed to be that of missing Irish teenager Nora Quoirin.
 18 August – Tipperary win the All Ireland Hurling final against Kilkenny.
 19 August
A roadside bomb explodes in Newtownbutler, County Fermanagh. It is believed the attack was targeting PSNI officers and that the Continuity IRA was responsible.
A 54-year-old man is shot dead in a car at a filling station in Waringstown, County Down.
 26 August – New figures revealed that over 1,600 cars had been impounded from unaccompanied learner drivers since new legislation was introduced in December.
 29 August – Sinn Féin was left a £1.5 million (€1.66m) donation in the will of London-born party supporter William E. Hampton.
 30 August – Beef farmers protesting at the ABP meat-processing plant in Bandon agreed a "one-day" deal to allow a Chinese delegation to visit the facility.
 31 August – Former Stormont education minister John O'Dowd signalled his ambition to replace Michelle O'Neill as Sinn Féin's vice president.

September
 1 September – The Catholic Church claimed for the first time that a pilgrim experienced a "miraculous cure" in Knock.
 2 September – Thomas Kavanagh, a senior figure in the Kinahan organised crime gang, was jailed in the UK for three years for possessing a disguised firearm.
 3 September – US Vice-President Mike Pence met with the Taoiseach and President Higgins at the start of his visit to Ireland.
 4 September – The EU's chief Brexit negotiator, Michel Barnier, pulled out of a planned visit to Northern Ireland.
 5 September – The World Health Organization revealed that Ireland has one of the highest levels of alcohol consumption and heavy drinking in Europe,
 6 September – Aontú leader Peadar Tóibín said if his party's candidates are electorally successful in Northern Ireland, they will not take their seats in the British Parliament.
 7 September – Over 180,000 cigarettes were seized after an Italian-registered merchant vessel was detained off the coast of Dublin by revenue officers.
 8 September – Labour Party leader Brendan Howlin accused the Government of being far too passive in its planning for a no-deal Brexit.
 9 September 
The Taoiseach and the British Prime Minister held their first face-to-face meeting to discuss Brexit since Boris Johnson took over at Number 10.
It was announced that Ireland's EU Commissioner Phil Hogan will be appointed the EU's chief trade negotiator.
 10 September – Up to 3,000 workers have been laid off at meat processing plants amid the ongoing dispute over beef prices, according to Meat Industry Ireland.
 11 September – Minister for Finance Paschal Donohoe ruled out any reductions in personal taxation in the next Budget.
 12 September 
Taoiseach Leo Varadkar said that May 2020 would be the "right moment" for a general election.
President Higgins said members of the Defence Forces should have incomes that are sufficient to provide for themselves and their families.
Independent TD Noel Grealish was criticised for comments he reportedly made at a public meeting in which he described African economic migrants as "spongers".
 13 September – The Taoiseach conceded that his party would be willing to support a Fianna Fáil-led Government under a new confidence and supply agreement.
 14 September – It was revealed that the Taoiseach decided not to remove the Fine Gael party whip from 'swing-gate' TD Maria Bailey following appeals from the Tánaiste.
 15 September – An agreement was reached between beef farmers and meat processors after 36 hours of talks organised by the Minister for Agriculture Michael Creed.
 16 September – Researchers at NUI Galway made aviation history by using drone technology to deliver diabetes medication to the Aran Islands.
 17 September – A former IRA member alleged that Gerry Adams "lied" by claiming he was never a member of the IRA.
 18 September – Kevin Lunney, a director of Quinn Industrial Holdings was left with a broken leg after he was abducted near his Fermanagh home and assaulted.
 19 September – Processing resumed at Slaney Meats, one of the meat plants that was at the centre of a month-long beef protest blockade.
 20 September 
 Thousands of Irish students took part in what was described as the largest global climate protest in history.
 The Museum of Literature Ireland (MoLI) opened in Dublin.
 21 September – The Irish Hospital Consultants' Association revealed that a million people are on waiting lists for acute hospital appointments.
 22 September – The last remaining beef protest blockade was stood down as farmers who had been blockading the Liffey Meats plant in Ballinasloe voted to end their action.
 23 September – The Taoiseach told the United Nations Climate Action Summit in New York that the Government was planning to phase out oil exploration in 80% Irish waters.
 24 September – The Taoiseach and the British Prime Minister held Brexit talks on the margins of the United Nations General Assembly.
 25 September – Fianna Fáil leader Micheál Martin called for the establishment of a cross-border multi-disciplinary agency to tackle criminal activity in the border region.
 27 September – The Finance Minister ruled out a supplementary budget in the event of a no-deal Brexit.
 28 September – John Delaney resigned from his position of Executive Vice President of the Football Association of Ireland with immediate effect.
 29 September – Gardaí recovered a very valuable 17th Century chalice that was stolen during a burglary in Ardee in 1998.
 30 September – The UK proposed the creation of a string of customs posts along both sides of the Irish border as part of its effort to replace the backstop.

October

 1 October
The Taoiseach insisted the British government should not "impose" customs checks "against the will of the people" north and south of the border.
The developer of a hotel in Oughterard which was earmarked to open as a direct provision centre withdrew his tender and would not be proceeding with the development.
 2 October – A whale, estimated to be 20 feet in length, was spotted in the River Liffey near the opening to Dublin Bay.
 3 October – The full force of Storm Lorenzo was felt along the west and south west coasts over night with high winds, torrential rain and heavy seas.
 4 October – Bailout funds amounting to some €450m to plug overspending in departments, most of which is in Health, were agreed by the Government.
 5 October – A number of workers were brought to hospital after a chemical leak in West Dublin.
 6 October – Two men were killed in a light aircraft crash in County Wexford.
 7 October – A number of road blocks were mounted by climate change activists in a Dublin city centre demonstration as part of the Extinction Rebellion campaign.
 8 October – Minister for Finance Paschal Donohoe announced his budget which included a €6 increase in the carbon tax.
 9 October – Fossilised bones from an amphibian-like creature that lived on the west coast 325 million years ago were found near Doolin.
 10 October – The Taoiseach said a Brexit deal by the 31 October deadline was possible following talks with British Prime Minister Boris Johnson in Liverpool.
 11 October – Fianna Fáil leader Micheál Martin ruled out an autumn snap general election if a successful EU-UK deal is negotiated before the Brexit Halloween deadline.
 13 October – The founding rector of Ireland's only Catholic university, precursor of University College Dublin, John Henry Newman was canonised by Pope Francis.
 28 October – Sinn Féin TD Martin Kenny's car was set ablaze outside his family home after he spoke out against anti-immigrant elements in Irish society.

November

 5 November – Two teenage boys received respective sentences of life and 15 years for the murder of 14-year-old Ana Kriégel last year.
 12 November 
A new law came into effect making the reckless overtaking of cyclists illegal, punishable by a fine of €120 and a minimum of three penalty points.
The Immigrant Council said comments by Independent TD Noel Grealish that €10 billion had been sent abroad over the last eight years are "shameful" and "racist".
 14 November – Controversial Fine Gael TD Maria Bailey was deselected as a candidate for the Dún Laoghaire constituency for the next general election.
 23 November- A Protest Rally was held in Roscommon town against the proposed closure of a respite Holiday Centre in the county.
 26 November – Four men appeared in court charged with assault and false imprisonment of Quinn Industrial Holdings director Kevin Lunney.
 28 November- It is revealed that the cost of the new Dáil printer for the Houses of the Oireachtas cost €1.6 million Euros 
 29 November – By-elections were held in Dublin Mid-West, Cork North-Central, Dublin Fingal and Wexford to replace outgoing TDs.
 30 November – Fine Gael TD Dara Murphy said he had been compliant "at all times" with Leinster House rules following criticism over his Dáil attendance.

December

 1 December 
Dublin receives its first dedicated 24-hour bus services, with the launch of Dublin Bus routes 15 and 41.
Former member of the Defence Forces Lisa Smith was arrested on suspicion of terrorist offences after arriving at Dublin Airport on a flight from Turkey.
 2 December – A new €22m white-water rafting facility in George's Dock was approved by Dublin City Council.
 3 December – The Government survived a motion of no confidence in Minister for Housing, Planning and Local Government Eoghan Murphy by three votes.
 4 December 
Fine Gael's Dara Murphy resigned his seat as TD for Cork North-Central to take up a new role in the European Commission.
Former Defence Forces member Lisa Smith appeared in court in Dublin charged with committing a terrorist offence between October 2015 and December 2019.
Gardaí launched an investigation after eight migrants were discovered hiding aboard a bulk cargo ship by crew in Waterford.
 5 December – Farmers mounted a 12-hour blockade of Aldi in Naas in protest over beef prices.
 6 December – The publication of the Football Association of Ireland's accounts revealed liabilities of €55m.
 7 December – The Taoiseach said imposing restrictions on TDs and senators from double-jobbing would "need consideration".
 8 December – Storm Atiyah made landfall in Ireland bringing high winds and rough seas as it tracked eastwards across the country.
 9 December – Kerry TD Michael Healy-Rae was treated for smoke inhalation after a fire broke out in his office/shop.
 10 December – A recently discovered painting by the Jack Butler Yeats, which lay hidden in a bank vault for 52 years, sold for more than triple its guide price.
 11 December – The Minister for Children announced that adopted people will not be given automatic access to their birth records under planned changes to legislation.
 12 December – The Irish harp was inscribed on the UNESCO list of Intangible Cultural Heritage.
 13 December – It was reported that Ireland had been granted an enhanced role in how the Brexit agreement will be implemented.
 14 December – The Taoiseach said an independent person may be appointed to examine the Dáil attendance record and expenses claims of former TD Dara Murphy.
 15 December – It was revealed that Fianna Fáil leader Micheál Martin had written to the Taoiseach seeking agreement on a date for the next general election.
 16 December – The High Court endorsed a European Arrest Warrant issued by the French Authorities who are seeking the extradition of Ian Bailey.
 17 December – The Minister for Justice announced that Ireland is to accept up to 2,900 refugees over the next four years through resettlement and community sponsorship.
 18 December – The Fine Gael Executive Council decided to deselect Verona Murphy as a candidate for the Wexford constituency for the next General Election.
 19 December – Three men charged with false imprisonment and attacking Quinn Industrial Holdings (QIH) director Kevin Lunney were denied bail in the High Court.
 22 December – Tesco Ireland withdrew Christmas cards from sale that were manufactured in a Chinese factory that is alleged to have used "forced labour".
 23 December 
The High Court rejected Ryanair's attempt to prevent operations chief Peter Bellew from joining rival EasyJet until 2021.
The Taoiseach wrote to Fianna Fáil leader Micheál Martin to say the two men should meet in the first days of 2020 to discuss an agreed general election date.
 28 December – Two people who were kayaking on Lough Derg near Garrykennedy were rescued by the RNLI after getting into difficulty.
 29 December – The Football Association of Ireland board apologised to those involved in Irish football, the public and its staff for "mistakes of the past".

Arts 
 8 January – The Arts Council withheld €300,000 in funding from the Abbey Theatre, pending confirmation of employment opportunities for Irish-based artists.
 18 January – The Cranberries band members were made Honorary Doctors of Letters at a special ceremony at the University of Limerick.
 31 January – Radio station RTÉ 2fm was renamed Larry Gogan FM for the day in honour of the DJ who retired after 40 years with the station.
 31 May – Radio station RTÉ 2fm celebrated its 40th anniversary.
 20 September – Museum of Literature Ireland (MoLI) opened in Dublin.
 26 November – It was announced that the David Cohen Prize for literature was being awarded to Edna O'Brien for her lifetime achievement.

Deaths

January 
 2 January 
Peter Kelly, 74, politician, TD (2002-2011), cancer.
Joe McCabe, 99, hurler (Clonad, Laois).
 4 January – John Nallen, 86, Gaelic footballer (Tuam Stars, Mayo, Galway).
 7 January – Jim Horgan, 63, sports reporter and radio journalist (Cork's 96FM).
 16 January – Alan McQuillan, 37, radio presenter and producer (RTÉ 2fm).
 19 January – Emma Church, 54, CervicalCheck scandal campaigner, cervical cancer.
 21 January – Padraic Fiacc, 94, poet.

February

 7 February 
Arthur Murphy, 90, singer and broadcaster.
Noel Reid, 80, racing journalist and broadcaster.
 8 February – Frankie Byrne, 94, Gaelic footballer (Meath).
 9 February 
Mick Kennedy, 57, footballer (Portsmouth, Stoke City, national team).
Tomi Ungerer, 87, French-born author and illustrator.
 11 February – Nora Bennis, 78, political activist and pro-life campaigner.
 28 February – Noel Mulcahy, 88, politician, Senator (1977–1981).

March

 1 March – Kevin Roche, 96, architect, Pritzker Prize winner (1982).
 2 March – Liam Gilmartin, 97, Gaelic footballer (Roscommon).
 4 March – Edward Collins, 78, politician, TD (1969–1987).
 14 March – Pat Laffan, 79, actor (The Snapper, Father Ted).
 16 March – Dessie Larkin, 49, politician, Councillor (1999-2014).
 17 March 
Richie Ryan, 90, politician, TD (1959-1982), MEP (1973-1977, 1979–1984) and Minister for Finance and the Public Service (1973-1977).
Mick Carley, 78, Gaelic footballer (Westmeath).
Bernie Tormé, 66, guitarist, singer and songwriter, pneumonia.
 18 March – Jackie Fahey, 91, politician, TD (1965-1992) and Minister of State (1979-1981).
 20 March – Laura Brennan, 26, HPV vaccine campaigner, cervical cancer.
 22 March - Philomena Canning, 59, activist and campaigner for women's health and birth rights, ovarian cancer.
 26 March - Bronco McLoughlin, 80, actor, stuntman and animal trainer.
 27 March – John Browne, 82, politician, Senator (1983-1987) and TD (1989-2002).

April

 2 April – Michael Fahy, 78, politician, Councillor (1979-2019).
 3 April – Pádraig Ó hUiginn, 94, civil servant.
 20 April – Terence Dolan, 76, academic and compiler of "A Dictionary of Hiberno-English."
 25 April – Feargal Quinn, 82, businessman and Senator (1983-2016), short illness.

May

 5 May – Eugene McGee, 77, journalist and Gaelic football manager (Offaly, Cavan, national team).
 16 May – Tommy O'Connell, 79, hurler (Fenians, Kilkenny).
 17 May – Anton O'Toole, 68, Gaelic footballer (Synge Street P.P., Dublin).
 19 May – Howard Kilroy, 83, accountant and businessman.
 21 May – Michael Lynch, 84, politician, TD (1982 and 1987–1989) and Senator (1983-1987).
 23 May – Pegg Monahan, 97, actress.
 25 May – Séamus McGrane, 64, dissident republican (Real IRA), heart attack.
 31 May – Paddy Fahey, 102, composer and fiddler.

June

 5 June 
Johnny McGrath, 88, hurler (Nenagh Éire Óg, Tipperary).
John Lynch, 86, Gaelic footballer (Tuam Stars, Roscommon).
 7 June – Ned Wheeler, 87, hurler (Faythe Harriers, Wexford, Leinster).
 9 June – Pádraig Carney, 91, Gaelic footballer (Castlebar Mitchels, Mayo, Connacht), short illness.
 12 June – Philomena Lynott, 88, author, entrepreneur and mother of Phil Lynott, cancer.
 18 June – Tom Dillon, 93, Gaelic footballer (Ahascragh, Galway, Connacht).
 20 June – Jimmy Reardon, 93, Olympic sprinter.
 23 June 
Manus Kelly, 41, rally driver, businessman and politician, Councillor (2019), race collision.
John Dillon, 76, hurler (Roscrea, Tipperary).
 25 June - Alfie Linehan, 79, cricketer (national team).
 28 June – Tom Jordan, 82, actor (Fair City).
 30 June – Brídín Uí Mhaolagáin, President of the Camogie Association (1991–1994).

July

 1 July – Mary Coyne, 108, Ireland's oldest person.
 8 July – Arthur Ryan, 83, businessman, short illness.
 9 July – John Bailey, 74, Gaelic games administrator and politician, Councillor (2004-2019), long illness.
 10 July – Noel Whelan, 50, barrister and political analyst, short illness.
 11 July 
Brendan Grace, 68, comedian and singer, lung cancer.
Séamus Hetherton, 89, Gaelic footballer (Cavan).
 14 July – Robert Elgie, 54, academic.
 15 July - Karl Shiels, 47, actor.
 16 July – Tommy Byrne, politician, Councillor (1999-2009 and 2014–2019), short illness.
 21 July – Eddie Bohan, 86, politician, Senator (1987-2007).
 23 July – Danika McGuigan, 33, actress, cancer.
 25 July – P. J. Qualter, 76, hurler (Turloughmore, Galway).
 31 July – Brendan Fennelly, 63, hurler (Ballyhale Shamrocks, Kilkenny) and manager (Carlow, Laois).

August
 6 August – Danny Doyle, 79, folk singer.
 12 August – John Coffey, 101, hurler (Boherlahan-Dualla, Tipperary).
 14 August – Billy Purcell, 58, hurler (Fenians, Kilkenny).
 18 August – Gillian Hanna, 75, actress (Les Misérables, All the Queen's Men, Oliver Twist), autoimmune disease.

September

 19 September – Sandie Jones, 68, singer, long illness.
 20 September – Séamus Hegarty, 79, Roman Catholic prelate, Bishop of Raphoe (1982–1994) and Derry (1994–2011).
 21 September – Gerard Mannion, 48, theologian.
 25 September – John McAdorey, 45, athlete, cancer.
 28 September – Dessie O'Halloran, 79, singer and fiddler, short illness.

October

 6 October – Seán Clohessy, 87, hurler (Tullaroan, Kilkenny, Leinster).
 7 October – Ulick O'Connor, 90, writer, historian and critic.
 9 October 
Éamonn Burns, 56, Gaelic footballer and manager (Bryansford, Down).
Thomas Flanagan, 89, Roman Catholic prelate, Auxiliary Bishop Emeritus of San Antonio (1998-2005).
 28 October – Art Foley, 90, hurler (Wexford, Leinster).
 29 October 
Pat Griffin, 75, Gaelic footballer (Glenbeigh-Glencar, Clonakilty, Kerry, Munster).
Johnny Joyce, 82, Gaelic footballer (St. Vincent's, Dublin, Leinster).
 30 October – Tom MacIntyre, 87, poet, playwright and writer.
 31 October – Denis Bernard, 86, Gaelic footballer (Dohenys, Cork, Munster).

November

 1 November – Daniel Mullins, 90, Roman Catholic prelate, Bishop of Menevia (1987–2001).
 4 November – Gay Byrne, 85, broadcaster (The Late Late Show The Gay Byrne Show), cancer.
 9 November – Cecil Pedlow, 84, rugby union player (Lions, national team).
 13 November – Niall Tóibín, 89, actor and comedian, complications from dementia.
 25 November 
Muiris Mac Conghail, 78, journalist, writer and broadcaster.
Terry Kelly, 86, hurler (Tracton, Blackrock, Cork, Munster), long illness.

December

 10 December – Paul Anthony McDermott, 47, barrister and academic, short illness.
 13 December – Roy Johnston, 90, physicist and political activist.
 14 December 
Billie Rattigan, 87, Gaelic footballer, (Dunshaughlin, Meath).
Barbara Wright, 84, academic and translator.
 17 December – Con Hartnett, 68, Gaelic footballer, (Millstreet, Cork).
 21 December – Frankie Kennedy, 78, Gaelic footballer, (Drumlane, Cavan).
 28 December – Jean Costello, 76, actress (Fair City).

See also

 2019 European Parliament election
 CervicalCheck cancer scandal

References